KGVW (640 AM) was a radio station licensed to serve Belgrade, Montana. The station was owned by Gallatin Valley Witness Inc. It aired a Religious radio format including some programming from the Moody Broadcasting Network.

Notable on-air personnel included: Operations Manager Lee Stevens (Williams),  Roger Torrenga.

The station was assigned the KGVW call letters by the Federal Communications Commission (FCC) on January 31, 2007.

The station's license was surrendered to the FCC by the licensee on June 18, 2013, and the FCC cancelled the license effective July 1, 2013.

References

External links

GVW
Belgrade, Montana
Moody Radio affiliate stations
Radio stations established in 2007
Radio stations disestablished in 2013
Defunct religious radio stations in the United States
2007 establishments in Montana
2013 disestablishments in Montana
GVW